Rafat is a Palestinian town, located approximately  southwest of the city of Ramallah in the central West Bank in the northern Jerusalem Governorate.  According to the Palestinian Central Bureau of Statistics, it had a population of 2,941 in 2017. Its total land area consists of 3,773 dunams.

Location
Rafat is located  10.9 km north-west of Jerusalem. It is bordered by Qalandiya to the east, Al Judeira to the north, Ramallah  to the west, and Beituniya to the south.

History
Ceramics from the  Byzantine era  have  been found here.

Ottoman  era
Rafat, like the rest of  Palestine, was incorporated into the Ottoman Empire in 1517, and in the census of 1596, the village was noted  in the Nahiya of Quds of the Liwa of Quds.  The population was 27 households, all Muslim. The villagers paid a fixed tax rate of 33,3% on various agricultural products, such as   wheat, barley, summer crops, goats and/or beehives,  in addition to "occasional revenues"; a total of  3,300  akçe.

In 1838, it was noted as a Muslim village in the Jerusalem District.

In 1863 Victor Guérin found Rafat to have one hundred and twenty inhabitants, and was   located on a mound. It had  mosque is dedicated to Sheikh Ahmed. He further noted that in  some houses several stones looked of  an ancient appearance. In one house he found a fragment of a broken column.

An Ottoman village list from about 1870 showed that rafat had 35 houses and a population of 100, though the population count included men, only.

In 1883, the PEF's Survey of Western Palestine (SWP)  described Rafat as: "a small hamlet on a ridge, with a spring to the west, and many rock cut tombs."

In 1896 the population of  Rafat  was estimated to be about 195 persons.

British Mandate era

In the 1922 census of Palestine conducted by the British Mandate authorities, Rafat had a population of 219 Muslims, while according to the 1931 census  Rafat had a population of 218 inhabitants, in 46 houses.

In the  1945 statistics, Rafat had a population of 280 Muslims, and a land area of 3,777 dunams. Of this, 252 dunams were designated for plantations and irrigable land, 1,965 dunams were for cereals, while 21 dunams were built-up.

Jordanian era
In the wake of the 1948 Arab–Israeli War, and after the 1949 Armistice Agreements,  Rafat  came under Jordanian rule.

In 1961, the population of Rafat was  504.

Post-1967
After the Six-Day War in 1967, Rafat has been under Israeli occupation. The population in the 1967 census conducted by the Israeli authorities was 499x5, 75 of whom originated from the Israeli territory.

According to ARIJ Israel has confiscated  287 dunums of land (8.5% of the total area of the village) for the construction of the Ofar military base. More lands have been confiscated from Rafat for the construction of the Israeli West Bank barrier.  637 dunums, which comprises 18.7% of the village’s total area, is isolated behind the wall, on the Israeli side.

References

Bibliography

 (p. 154-155)

External links
  Welcome To Rafat
Rafat, Welcome to Palestine
Survey of Western Palestine, Map 17:  IAA, Wikimedia commons 
Rafat Village (Fact Sheet),   Applied Research Institute–Jerusalem (ARIJ)
Rafat Village Profile, ARIJ
Rafat, aerial photo, ARIJ
Locality Development Priorities and Needs in Rafat, ARIJ

Villages in the West Bank
Jerusalem Governorate
Municipalities of the State of Palestine